Protarchella is a genus of moths belonging to the subfamily Tortricinae of the family Tortricidae.

Species
Protarchella acheensis Diakonoff, 1983
Protarchella antirrhopa Diakonoff, 1956
Protarchella atalohypha Diakonoff, 1974
Protarchella bebaea Diakonoff, 1974
Protarchella centrophracta (Meyrick, 1924)
Protarchella chalcotypa (Diakonoff, 1954)
Protarchella conioplegma (Diakonoff, 1954)
Protarchella cyclopa Diakonoff, 1956
Protarchella euschema Diakonoff, 1974
Protarchella exarthra (Meyrick, 1918)
Protarchella leptomorpha (Diakonoff, 1954)
Protarchella lyssodes (Meyrick, 1910)
Protarchella meesi Diakonoff, 1960
Protarchella nivis (Diakonoff, 1941)
Protarchella paraptera (Meyrick, 1910)
Protarchella torquens Diakonoff, 1960
Protarchella xenographa (Diakonoff, 1954)

See also
List of Tortricidae genera

References

External links
tortricidae.com

Tortricidae genera